The Kyurinsky okrug was a district (okrug) of the Dagestan Oblast of the Caucasus Viceroyalty of the Russian Empire. The area of the Kyurinsky okrug is included in contemporary Dagestan of the Russian Federation. The district's administrative centre was Kasumkent.

Administrative divisions 
The subcounties (uchastoks) of the Kyurinsky okrug were as follows:

Demographics

Russian Empire Census 
The majority of the population indicated Kyurin to be their mother tongue, with a significant Kazi-Kumukh speaking minority.

Kavkazskiy kalendar 

Notes

References

Bibliography 

Okrugs of Dagestan Oblast